Johan Lindeberg (born 4 August 1957 in Lund, Sweden) is a Swedish fashion designer born in Lund, Sweden. Being from a small university town Lindeberg witnessed the energy of student protests and rebellion, which he would draw inspiration from for the rest of his career. He is the founder of J.Lindeberg (where he is currently creative director), Paris68, and BLK DNM. He has previously worked with Hans Brindfors Annonsbyra ad agency, Diesel, William Rast, and Absolut. Johan met his wife Marcella Lindeberg while working at Diesel. Together they have a daughter, Blue Lindeberg, who is a model.

Early life
Johan Lindeberg attended college in Boston, Massachusetts. He was initially a travelling businessman trading wood chips showcasing his entrepreneurial spirit. However, he felt that business was not the career path for him and pursued fashion design as he was inspired by his sister who was also a designer.

Diesel 
Johan Lindeberg's career started in the late 1980s as managing director of one of the top ad agencies at the time, Hans Brindfors Annonsbyra. Without any retail experience, he sought the proper distribution and increased Diesel's sales in Sweden from 1,000 to 200,000 pairs of jeans. He was then asked by the founder of Diesel, Renzo Rosso, himself to be the International Marketing Director in 1992.

Lindeberg was able to leave an everlasting impact as the $17.5 million campaign he created is still used today by the brand. The "For Successful Living" campaign was based on the fashion industry concept that the right jeans or sports shoes will change a person's life. In fall of 1994 Diesel won the Grand Prix at the Nordic Advertising Festival for a spot showing a monster emerging chasing a screaming girl who leads him into a trap with a big net. The spot ends with a meat grinder and grilled monster burgers. Lindeberg went on to become CEO of Diesel US but resigned from his duties due to fatigue from constantly restraining his own visions

J.Lindeberg 
Johan Lindeberg founded the J.Lindeberg brand in 1996. Whilst traveling through Europe on his motorcycle he visualized a fashion brand that reflected his personal and creative values as just as much as his own identity. A brand that Johan himself would love to wear, a brand he couldn't find anywhere else.

Johan launched his brand during the summer of 1996 in Stockholm and New York simultaneously. The brand was named J.Lindeberg after Johan's own signature style and together with a number of investors the company was born, Johan himself committing all his financial resources in the start up. Two parallel offices where assembled, one in Stockholm's port district and one on 57th street Manhattan in New York City, as the brand would be international from the start. With himself as Creative Director, Johan assembled a small team of designers headed by Roland Hjort who was recruited from the Swedish apparel brand H&M.

Johan was able to change the golfing fashion landscape when he dressed Jesper Parnevik in vibrant pink pants. It was something the golf world hadn't seen before and established Parnevik as a style icon of golf. Lindeberg is also credited with making skinny tailored suits before it became a trend. His uniqueness and attention to detail is featured throughout J.Lindeberg. The brand has been featured on red carpets for award shows and premieres being worn by celebrities such as Ashton Kutcher, Zac Efron, Brad Pitt, and Scott Piercy.

Paris68 
As Johan and his wife Marcella relocated to New York City, they started a high end brand consulting agency in 2007. The company was called Paris68 paying homage to the student revolution carried on in the French capital in May 1968.

William Rast 
When Johan received a call from Reinard Hasse, the German importer for William Rast, he was initially uninterested as he had J.Lindeberg and Paris68 to work on. It wasn't until he met the founder, Justin Timberlake, who was also a fan of J.Lindeberg that he was on board. Lindeberg and Marcella became Creative Directors of the brand where Johan was overseeing the menswear division and his wife running the women's division. They had a vision to create something that combined both the modernity and coolness of Hollywood and the rough roots of Tennessee. William Rast is a cross culture linking glamour influences and the spirit of Justin's roots. Lindeberg and Timberlake worked very closely and got along so well that he became Timberlake's personal stylist.

Departure 
Up until 2007 Johan was respectively juggling three projects: J.Lindeberg, Paris68, and William Rast. However, due to pressure from investors, Johan felt creatively blocked and left J.Lindeberg 2007 and William Rast in 2009.

BLK DNM 
In 2010 Johan Lindeberg started a new project under the Kellwood Company, BLK DNM with their first collection launching in February 2011. BLK DNM was a project that was established at a difficult time in Johan's life as he and Marcella separated. Lindeberg was determined to find himself and channel his negative energy into something creative. He based the brand on his staple wardrobe items which were his signature leather jacket and black denim jeans. BLK DNM was sold exclusively online and to select amount of retailers in order to cut the middleman to avoid excessive mark ups and offer accessible retail pricing. The brand is known for its chic simplistic look that can easily be dressed up or worn casually. It has been featured on magazine covers, worn by celebrities such as Sarah Jessica Parker, Kim Kardashian, and Jay Z and Beyonce for their Run The World Tour. In May 2015 it was publicized that Johan Lindeberg would be leaving BLK DNM to focus on personal projects.

Photography 
Johan also discovered his passion for photography as an outlet to communicate and express himself when he was shooting street posters for BLK DNM. He picked up the camera for the first time in August 2011 and has since worked with renowned models, Gisele Bündchen, Kenza Fourati, Anja Rubik, and Arizona Muse. His goal has always been to capture the person and who they are, not their model persona. Lindeberg's subject for photography has grown and expanded as he traveled to India with his daughter to document the women of Nepal following the earthquake in 2015. In November 2015 Mazdack Rassi of Milk Studios hosted Lindeberg's gallery as an exhibition and won an award. Johan Lindeberg has a personal website where all of his photography can be seen.

Absolut Elyx 
In 2013 Johan Lindeberg took on a new project as creative director for the Absolut's new luxury vodka, Absolut Elyx. There he focused on positioning, strategy, and creative direction. He conceived and photographed brand's launch campaign series featuring Chloe Sevigny, Adriana Varejão and Charlotte Gainsbourg. One of the most notable details of the campaign was Lindeberg's ability to capture the brand ambassadors in raw industrial spaces giving them a new edge.

Return to J.Lindeberg 
In 2015 it was announced that Johan Lindeberg would return to his namesake brand after 10 years apart as creative director. After discussions with a J.Lindeberg co-owner and being persuaded by his daughter, he decided to return to the first brand he ever created. He plans on re-envisioning the voice and lifestyle of the brand with plans to launch a special collection for the 20th anniversary in 2017. Another special project Johan has planned is The Bridge Series launching August 2016 featuring a variety of individuals, who get the chance to express something meaningful and unique to them. Promotional efforts include a magazine, and street posters.

Awards 

1993 – Best dressed man in Sweden
1994 – Won the Grand Prix at the Nordic Advertising Festival
1999 – Swedish Elle presented J.Lindeberg with the "Designer of the Year" award
2000 – Lindeberg received the prestigious "Guldknappen" (golden button) award for "Most Innovative Designer"
2012 – GQ's best new menswear designer

References

Living people
Swedish fashion designers
1957 births